Seo Yeong-jun (born 8 March 1995) is a South Korean ice hockey player. He competed in the 2018 Winter Olympics.

References

External links

1995 births
Living people
Daemyung Killer Whales players
Ice hockey players at the 2018 Winter Olympics
South Korean ice hockey defencemen
Olympic ice hockey players of South Korea
Asian Games silver medalists for South Korea
Medalists at the 2017 Asian Winter Games
Asian Games medalists in ice hockey
Ice hockey players at the 2017 Asian Winter Games